Ron Elliott is a Canadian politician, who was elected as the Member of the Legislative Assembly for the electoral district of Quttiktuq in the Legislative Assembly of Nunavut in the 2008 territorial election.

References

Living people
Members of the Legislative Assembly of Nunavut
21st-century Canadian politicians
People from Arctic Bay
Year of birth missing (living people)